William Pascoe Crook (1775–1846), a missionary, schoolmaster and pastor. He was born in Dartmouth, Devon, England on 29 April 1775. He was the first missionary to document the Marquesas Islands in an ethnographical account after he was sent by the London Missionary Society, embarking on board Duff in June 1796. Initially he was accompanied by John Harris but was left to his work alone when Harris travelled with the ship to Tahiti after Crook had landed in Vaitahu Bay. In 1798 the whaler Butterworth visited the Marquesas. Crook embarked on her to return to England, which he did when she arrived there in May 1799.

He was responsible for the raising and education of Pōmare III, the infant King of Tahiti, before he died prematurely in 1827.

Crook died 14 June 1846 and was buried in the Old Melbourne Cemetery. He is supposed to be a translator of the first Polynesian bible.

Bibliography
 S. Marsden, A Letter to Mr William Crook (Sydney, 1835)
 J. Ham, A Biographical Sketch of the Life and Labours of the Late Rev. William Pascoe Crook (Melbourne, 1846)
 William Pascoe Crook, An Account of the Marquesas Islands 1797–1799, ed. Greg Dening et al. (2007)

References

External links

 Niel Gunson, 'Crook, William Pascoe (1775 - 1846)', Australian Dictionary of National Biography, Volume 1, Melbourne University Press, 1966, pp 259-261.

People from Dartmouth, Devon
1775 births
1846 deaths
British Congregationalist missionaries
British Congregationalist ministers
19th-century British educators
British expatriates in French Polynesia
Congregationalist missionaries in French Polynesia